Urazeh (also Romanized as Ūrāzeh; also known as Tamar Khān and Ūrāzū) is a village in Zamkan Rural District, in the Central District of Salas-e Babajani County, Kermanshah Province, Iran. At the 2006 census, its population was 210, in 46 families.

References 

Populated places in Salas-e Babajani County